Maximiliano 'Pipi' Bajter Ugollini (born 1 March 1986 in Montevideo) is a Uruguayan football player currently playing for Villa Teresa. He is also known as "Pipi", or "Pitón", nickname given to him by his former coach at Peñarol, Julio Ribas, since he consider Pipi "was not a proper nickname for a gladiator"

Career

Uruguay
Bajter began his professional career at Montevideo-based club Peñarol where he played between 2006 and 2010, winning the Primera División in his last year. Despite being successful, in terms of trophies and personal performance, he was plagued with injuries in his later years at Peñarol. The club, therefore, allowed him to rebuild form at another Montevideo club Fénix on loan, where he played until early summer of 2011.

Norway
On 18 July 2011, Bajter arrived in Bergen where he signed a loan contract until the end of the 2011 Norwegian Premier League season with SK Brann. Uruguay-based Norwegian football agent Terje Liverød — who has previously been involved in several transfers of Uruguayan players to Europe, including Bajter's new Brann team mate Diego Guastavino — was the main driving force behind the transfer.

He made his debut for the Bergen club on 4 August 2011 in the Vestlandsderby against Viking after coming on for an injured Zsolt Korcsmár in the second half. At the end of the year, Brann had the option to make Bajter a permanent signing, but opted against doing so after Bajter's last game against Aalesund.

Career statistics

Trivia
Bajter has a wife and a two-year-old daughter who both moved to Norway with him.

He signed his contract with Brann on 18 July, Jura de la Constitución de la República Oriental del Uruguay (Uruguay's constitution day). So, when he was offered 18 as his squad number, he said that "it felt completely natural."

References

External links
 

1986 births
Living people
Footballers from Montevideo
Uruguayan footballers
Uruguayan Primera División players
Eliteserien players
Chilean Primera División players
Liga MX players
Bolivian Primera División players
Peñarol players
Centro Atlético Fénix players
SK Brann players
C.D. Veracruz footballers
The Strongest players
Unión La Calera footballers
Deportivo Pereira footballers
Liverpool F.C. (Montevideo) players
Rangers de Talca footballers
Expatriate footballers in Norway
Uruguayan expatriate sportspeople in Norway
Expatriate footballers in Chile
Uruguayan expatriate sportspeople in Chile
Expatriate footballers in Mexico
Uruguayan expatriate sportspeople in Mexico
Expatriate footballers in Bolivia
Expatriate footballers in Colombia
Uruguayan expatriate footballers
Association football midfielders